The yellow-gaped honeyeater (Microptilotis flavirictus) is a species of bird in the family Meliphagidae. 
It is found throughout New Guinea.
Its natural habitats are subtropical or tropical moist lowland forests and subtropical or tropical moist montane forests.

References

yellow-gaped honeyeater
Birds of New Guinea
yellow-gaped honeyeater
Taxonomy articles created by Polbot